The Breithorn (4164 m, from German: broad horn) is a mountain located in the Pennine Alps on the border between Switzerland (Valais) and Italy (Aosta Valley).

It is also the name of several other mountains:

Switzerland
Breithorn (Lauterbrunnen) (3780 m), part of the Bernese Alps, between the Lauterbrunnental and the Lötschental
Breithorn (Blatten) (3785 m), part of the Bernese Alps, between the Lötschental and the major valley of Valais, belongs to the municipality of Blatten
Kleines Breithorn (3656 m), 300 m south of Breithorn (Blatten)
Breithorn (Simplon) (3437 m)
Breithorn (St. Niklaus) (3178 m)
Breithorn (Grengiols) (2599 m), part of the Lepontine Alps and the municipality of Grengiols, in the district of Östlich Raron, Valais
Austria
Breithorn (Steinernes Meer) in the Steinernes Meer, Nördliche Kalkalpen
Breithorn (Loferer Steinberge) in the Loferer Steinberge, Nördliche Kalkalpen

See also
Broad Peak (named after the Breithorn)